Andrew King (born 3 July 1975) is an Australian former professional rugby league footballer who played for the Gold Coast Chargers, Manly-Warringah, Northern Eagles and South Sydney in the National Rugby League (NRL), and London Broncos in the Super League.

Biography
Born in Lismore, King started his NRL career at the Gold Coast Chargers, recruited from the Marist Brothers Rams. He played as a full-back for the Gold Coast and made 49 first-grade appearances from 1995 to 1998, missing the 1996 season when he went to England to play for the Keighley Cougars.

King competed for Manly-Warringah in 1999, then had two seasons at the Northern Eagles following Manly's merger. In the 2001 season he began playing as a centre.

In 2002 he joined South Sydney for the club's first season back in the NRL. He featured in 20 first-grade games for the Rabbitohs.

King was retained by South Sydney in 2003 and finished his professional career in England, with the London Broncos in the Super League.

He is the middle of the three King brothers who played in the NRL. His elder brother Chris King played for Parramatta and his younger brother Matt King won a grand final with the Melbourne Storm.

References

External links
Andrew King at Rugby League project

1975 births
Living people
Australian rugby league players
Gold Coast Chargers players
Keighley Cougars players
London Broncos players
Manly Warringah Sea Eagles players
Northern Eagles players
Rugby league centres
Rugby league fullbacks
Rugby league players from Lismore, New South Wales
South Sydney Rabbitohs players